Tébessa is a province (wilayah) of Algeria. Tébessa is also the name of the capital, which in ancient times it was known as Theveste. Another important city is El Ouenza. Tébessa is located only 20 kilometers west of the Tunisian  border.

History
The province was created from Annaba department and Batna (département) in 1974.

In 1984 Khenchela Province was carved out of its territory.

Administrative divisions
The province is divided into 12 districts (daïras), which are further divided into 28 communes or municipalities.

Districts

 Bir El Ater
 Bir Mokadem
 Cheria
 El Aouïnet
 El Kouif
 El Ma Labiodh
 El Ogla
 Morsott
 Negrine
 Ouenza
 Oum Ali
 Tebessa

Communes

 Ain Zerga
 Bedjene
 Bekkaria
 Bir Dheheb (Bir Dheb)
 Bir El Ater (Bir-El-Ater)
 Bir Mokadem
 Boukhadra
 Boulhaf Dir (Boulhaf Dyr)
 Cheria
 El Aouinet (El-Aouinnet)
 El Kouif
 El Ma El Biod (El Malabiodh)
 El Meridj
 El Mezeraa
 El Ogla
 El Ogla Malha (Ogla Melha)
 Ferkane
 Guorriguer
 Hammamet
 Lahouidjbet
 Morsott (Morsot)
 Negrine
 Ouenza
 Oum Ali
 Safsaf Ouesra (Saf Saf El Ouesra)
 Stah Guentis
 Tebessa
 Tlidjen (Tlidjene, Thelidjene)

References

 
Provinces of Algeria
States and territories established in 1974